Michael Simpson (born 28 February 1974) is an English former professional footballer who currently plays for Mickleover Country Park B Veterans FC, making his debut in a 2-1 loss to Kimberly Town Veterans.

Career
Born in Nottingham, Nottinghamshire, Simpson began his career at one of his hometown clubs, Notts County. He made 43 starts for the Magpies, before moving to Wycombe Wanderers on loan in 1996. He then made his return to Notts county and made a further appearance before Plymouth Argyle came in for his services in the same season of 1996-97. He made 10 starts for Plymouth and a further 2 substitute appearances. In 1997, Simpson returned to Wycombe Wanderers, where he finally found home. In a highly successful seven years at Wycombe, he clocked up 251 starts and 15 as a substitute. Simpson played a big part in Wycombe's famous FA Cup run of the 2000/01 season, where they beat then Premiership Leicester City to reach the semi-finals.

Simpson's great Wycombe career was halted in 2004, where he was released after their relegation to League Two. He signed for Leyton Orient in the summer of 2004 on a free transfer. Since his arrival at Brisbane Road, he has chalked up 105 appearances and 3 goals.

In November 2007 after a lengthy injury, he linked up with Burton Albion and was an integral part of the squad which won promotion to The Football League in 2009.

Simpson was released at the end of the 2009–10 season, before joining Eastwood Town.

Honours
Notts County
Anglo-Italian Cup: 1994–95

Burton Albion
Conference Premier: 2008–09

References

External links

1974 births
Living people
Footballers from Nottingham
English footballers
Association football midfielders
Notts County F.C. players
Plymouth Argyle F.C. players
Wycombe Wanderers F.C. players
Leyton Orient F.C. players
Burton Albion F.C. players
Eastwood Town F.C. players
Graham Street Prims F.C. players
English Football League players
National League (English football) players
East Midlands Counties Football League players